Wolfgang Glock (born 16 January 1944) is a retired West German rower. He competed at the 1968 Summer Olympics in the double sculls event, together with Udo Hild, and finished in sixth place. He won four national titles, two in the single sculls (1969 and 1972) and two in the double sculls (1967 and 1968).

References

1944 births
Living people
Olympic rowers of West Germany
Rowers at the 1968 Summer Olympics
German male rowers
Rowers from Frankfurt